Lake Anita State Park is a state park of Iowa, US, featuring a  reservoir on a branch of the Nishnabotna River.  The park is located south of Anita on Iowa State Highway 148.

Facilities
The campground, one of the most popular in southwest Iowa, offers 161 sites, two shower-and-restroom facilities, and a playground.  Several picnic areas overlook the reservoir, and 8 open shelters can be reserved for private events.

Recreation
Lake Anita State Park includes a beach and two boat ramps.  All boating is at no-wake speeds.  Docks are available for seasonal rent.  Fishing is geared toward largemouth bass, crappies, and bluegills.  A  self-guided nature trail interprets the trees and shrubs of the region.  A  trail for walking and bicycling circles the lake.

References

External links
 Lake Anita State Park

State parks of Iowa
Protected areas established in 1961
Protected areas of Cass County, Iowa